Adriana Vacarezza Etcheverry (born October 8, 1961, in Antofagasta) is a Chilean television and theatre actress. She is the sister of the television presenter Marcela Vacarezza.

Adriana studied theatre at "Escuela de la Pontificia Universidad Católica de Chile". Debuted in the telenovela "Los Títeres" directed by Oscar Rodríguez. In 2007 joins Chilevisión.

Filmography

Telenovelas 
 Los titeres (Canal 13 – 1984) as Márgara
 La Trampa (Canal 13 – 1985) as Maria Blanca "Mariblanca" Madrid
 Secreto de Familia (Canal 13 – 1986) as Paz Barca
 La invitacion (Canal 13 – 1987) as Ruth
 Semidios (Canal 13 – 1988) es Jeannette
 Bravo (Canal 13 – 1989) as Sussy
 Ellas por Ellas (Canal 13 – 1991) as Marlene
 Trampas y Caretas (TVN – 1992) as María Fernanda
 Fácil de amar (Canal 13 – 1992) as Verónica
 Ámame (TVN – 1993) as Fernanda Rivarosa
 Rojo y Miel (TVN – 1994) as Carla
 El amor está de moda (Canal 13 – 1995) as Carmen
 Marrón Glacé, el regreso (Canal 13 – 1996) as Susana
 Oro Verde (TVN – 1997) as Bernardita "Berny" Alemparte
 Tic Tac (TVN – 1997) as Calú Barcelona
 Borron y cuenta nueva (TVN – 1998) as Carola Sutíl
 Cerro Alegre (Canal 13 – 1999) as Emilia San Martín
 Machos (Canal 13 – 2003) as Isabel Füller
 Amor en tiempo record (TVN – 2006) as Carmen de Yávar
 Vivir con 10 (CHV – 2007) as Victoria Salazar
 ¿Dónde está Elisa? (TVN – 2009) as Isabel Salazar

Television Series
 Ángeles (1988) as Ángela
 Teatro en Canal 13 (canal 13 – 1995 y 1998)
 Las historias de sussy (TVN – 1997) as Ruth
 Mi último hombre (1996) as Valeria (journalist)
 Mi Abuelo mi nana y yo (Sitcom – TVN – 1998) as María Ignacia Luco
 Mea Culpa (TVN – 2002) as Doralisa
 La vida es una loteria (TVN – 2002) as Astrid
 Los Debutantes (2003) as Bernardita
 Los simuladores (Canal 13 – 2005) as Teresa
 Bienvenida Realidad (TVN – 2005) as Madre de Leticia
 Urgencias (serie – MEGA – 2005) as Katty Sandoval
 Teatro en Chilevisión "Playa Luna" (CHV – 2008 y 2010) as Vicky de Pérez-Cotapos

External links
 

1959 births
Chilean actresses
Chilean telenovela actresses
Chilean people of Italian descent
Chilean people of Basque descent
Living people
People from Antofagasta
Pontifical Catholic University of Chile alumni